Goy is a surname. Notable people with the name include:

 Peter Goy (1938–2021), a former professional footballer
 Philippe Goy (born 1941), a French science fiction writer
 Luba Goy (born 1945), a Canadian actress and comedian
 Sylvie Goy-Chavent (born 1963), a French politician and a member of the Senate of France